Zsuzsa Csisztu (born February 15, 1970) is a Hungarian former artistic gymnast. She competed at the 1988 Summer Olympics. In 1992 she started her cooperation with television and has worked as a TV presenter and actress since then.

References

External links
 

1970 births
Living people
Hungarian female artistic gymnasts
Gymnasts at the 1988 Summer Olympics
Olympic gymnasts of Hungary
Minnesota Golden Gophers women's gymnasts
Gymnasts from Budapest